Thamsanqa Keith Nunu (born 18 August 1998) is a Zimbabwean cricketer. In February 2017, he was named in an academy squad by Zimbabwe Cricket to tour England later that year. He made his List A debut for Rising Stars in the 2017–18 Pro50 Championship on 17 April 2018. He made his first-class debut for Rising Stars in the 2017–18 Logan Cup on 19 April 2018. In December 2020, he was selected to play for the Tuskers in the 2020–21 Logan Cup.

References

External links
 

1998 births
Living people
Zimbabwean cricketers
Place of birth missing (living people)
Rising Stars cricketers